Edna Wildey Welty (November 24, 1882 – March 29, 1970) was an American tennis player of the start of the 20th century.

Wildey who originated from Plainfield, New Jersey reached the women's doubles final of the U.S. National Championship five times but did not succeed in winning a title. She reached the finals of the mixed doubles twice but again did not win a title.

Grand Slam finals

Doubles (5 runner-ups)

Mixed doubles (2 runner-ups)

References

1882 births
1970 deaths
American female tennis players
Sportspeople from Plainfield, New Jersey
Sportspeople from Monmouth County, New Jersey
Tennis people from New Jersey